The Melbourne Glaciers are an Australian junior ice hockey team based in Melbourne, Victoria playing in the Australian Junior Ice Hockey League. They represent one of the two junior ice hockey teams from Victoria currently playing in the AJIHL, which is the most elite level for ice hockey at a national level for ages between 16 and 20 years old.

History

AJIHL

The Melbourne Red Wings were founded 18 September 2012 following the announcement by Ice Hockey Australia of the formation of the Australian Junior Ice Hockey League. The team is controlled by the Victorian Ice Hockey Association. On 14 October 2012 it was announced that Warren Porter had signed on as coach for the 2012–13 AJIHL season with Michael Flaherty as his assistant.

The first team in club history:

For the 2012–13 AJIHL season

AJIHL Expansion

The follow up season in the Australian Junior Ice Hockey League saw a lot of change via expansion and renaming of its existing teams. The Melbourne Red Wings were renamed the Melbourne Glaciers on 22 August 2013. The changes were made in response to the National Hockey Leagues concern about the AJIHL using their team names and logos but also recognised the opportunity to create a new history for the teams through creating their own identity.

In October 2013 the league expanded to six teams with two teams from Perth, the Sharks and the Pelicans, joining for the start of the 2013–14 season.

Logo and Uniform

2012-2013 Melbourne Red Wings

In their first year, and the inaugural AJIHL season, the Melbourne Red Wings wore a uniform that resembled the NHL namesake Detroit Red Wings. The jersey design and uniform bore close resemblance to the Detroit Red Wings design, with the AJIHL logo used for shoulder crests.

2013-present

On 22 August 2013 it was announced that the Melbourne Red Wings would change their name to the Melbourne Glaciers, which avoided the close resemblance with the Detroit Red Wings of the NHL after the NHL had made complaint about a breach of copyright and it also allowed the team to develop its own brand identity.

The renaming to Melbourne Glaciers was carefully chosen to reflect Australia's rich hockey culture. The name Glaciers is a tribute to the Melbourne Glaciarium, which was the first place that an ice hockey game was played in Australia on Tuesday 17 July 1906. The Melbourne Glaciarium was also home to one of the original 4 ice hockey teams in Australia called the Glaciarium, who were founded as part of the formation of the Victorian Ice Hockey Association (VIHA) in 1908.

On 13 September 2013, the new Melbourne Glaciers logo design and branding was created by Ross Carpenter and his son, Jack Carpenter, who was largely involved in the creation of the uniform design.

The suggestion to use Glaciers as a new name for the Melbourne Red Wings was made by Michael Flaherty and the reasoning behind it was to honor the Melbourne Glaciarium, the location of the first game of ice hockey game played in Australia. The league made the decision to continue using a predominantly red jersey and provided a limit of 4 colors. The decision to use red as a base colour is thought to honor their patron of the time, Basil Hansen, who first played for the VIHA Red Arrows in 1947. The colors used were charcoal grey, a blue-grey and white to create a palette with glacial coloring.

 

 
The Melbourne Glaciarium was situated on the bank of the Yarra River, facing Melbourne city which is currently referred to as South Gate. When it was built in 1906 it was the third largest ice arena in the world and seated 2000 patrons, though peak attendance could see up to 5000 patrons in the venue at one time.

Season by season results

Players

Current roster

<small>For the 2016–17 AJIHL season

Captains

The first team Captain for the Melbourne Red Wings in the inaugural year for the AJIHL was Brendan McDowell, his Alternate Captains were Matt Stringer and Chris Fahy.

 2012–13 Brendan McDowell (C), Matt Stringer (A), Chris Fahy (A)
 2013–14 Mitch Humphries (C), Jack Carpenter (A), Daniel Szalinski (A)
 2015–16 Caleb Butler (C), Corey Stringer (A), David Foster (A)
 2016–17 Corey Stringer (C), David Foster (A), Taras Cheprakov (A)

Head coaches
The first Head Coach for the Melbourne Red Wings in the inaugural year for the AJIHL was Warren Porter.

 2012–13 Warren Porter
 2013–14 Warren Porter
 2014–15 Douglas Stevenson
 2015–16 Douglas Stevenson
 2016–17 James Galdes
 2018–19 Michael Flaherty
 2019–20 Michael Flaherty

See also

Australian Junior Ice Hockey League
Sydney Sabres
Sydney Wolf Pack
Melbourne Whalers
Perth Pelicans
Perth Sharks
Ice Hockey Australia
Ice Hockey New South Wales
Australian Women's Ice Hockey League
Australian Ice Hockey League
Jim Brown Trophy
Goodall Cup
Joan McKowen Memorial Trophy

References

Australian Junior Ice Hockey League
Sporting clubs in Melbourne
Ice hockey teams in Australia
2012 establishments in Australia
Ice hockey clubs established in 2012
Sport in the City of Melbourne (LGA)